The Oregon State Beavers football team represents Oregon State University in NCAA Division I FBS college football. The team first fielded an organized football team in 1893 and is a member of the Pac-12 Conference. Jonathan Smith has been the head coach since November 29, 2017. Their home games are played at Reser Stadium in Corvallis, Oregon.

History

Early history
Football at Oregon State University started in 1893 shortly after athletics were initially authorized at the college. Athletics were banned prior to May 1892, but when the strict school president, Benjamin Arnold, died, President John Bloss reversed the ban. Bloss' son, William, started the first team, on which he served as both coach and quarterback. The team's first game was an easy 64–0 victory on November 11, 1893, over visiting Albany College.

Conference affiliations
The university has been in several athletic conferences. Prior to joining the Pac-12 Conference (then called the Pacific-8 Conference), OSU intermittently played as an independent school.

 Oregon Intercollegiate Football Association (1893-1897)
 Independent (1898–1901, 1903–1907, 1909–1911)
 Northwest Intercollegiate Athletic Association (1902, 1908, 1912–1914)
 Pacific Coast Conference (1915–1958)
 Independent (1959–1963)
 Pac-12 Conference (1964–present)

Conference championships
Oregon State has won seven conference titles, done through four different conferences, although two of them have links to the current Pac-12 Conference, as the conference claims the history of the PCC as their own, and the Athletic Association of Western Universities was the first name for the conference that later became the Pac-12 Conference.

† Co-championship

Other claimed Championships

The 1897 Oregon Agricultural Aggies football team compiled a perfect 5–0 record, shut out four of five opponents, and outscored their opponents by a combined total of 164 to 8. the team claimed their 2nd league Championship (OIFA)

The Aggies defeated Oregon (26–8) and Washington (16–0).

With those two wins, they then proclaimed themselves regional "Champions of the Northwest".

The 1907 Oregon Agricultural Aggies football team represented Oregon Agricultural College (now known as Oregon State University) as an independent during the 1907 college football season.

In their second season under head coach Fred Norcross, the Aggies compiled a perfect 6–0 record, did not allow any of their opponents to score, and outscored their opponents by a combined total of 137 to 0. The Aggies' victories included games against Oregon (4–0), Pacific University (49–0), and Willamette University  (42–0).

Oregon State's victory at Loyola, then known as the St. Vincent's College Saints, was a big deal out West, a Thanksgiving Day matchup of the "Champions of the Northwest" and the "Champions of the California", with the winner taking home the "Championship" of the entire West Coast.

The Oregon Agricultural Aggies' then proclaimed themselves "Champions of the Pacific Coast" 

This is still the only perfect season in Oregon State history, and moreover, they did not allow a single point this season.

Head coaches 
List of head coaches and tenure.

 Will Bloss (1893)
 Guy Kennedy (1894)
 Paul Downing (1895)
 Tommy Code (1896)
 Will Bloss (1897)
 No coach (1898)
 Hiland Orlando Stickney (1899)
 No team (1900–1901)
 Fred Herbold (1902)
 Thomas L. McFadden (1903)
 Allen Steckle (1904–1905)
 Fred Norcross (1906–1908)
 Sol Metzger (1909)
 George Schildmiller (1910)
 Sam Dolan (1911–1912)
 E. J. Stewart (1913–1915)
 Joseph Pipal (1916–1917)
 Homer Woodson Hargiss (1918–1919)
 R. B. Rutherford (1920–1923)
 Paul J. Schissler (1924–1932)
 Lon Stiner (1933–1942)
 No team (1943–1944)
 Lon Stiner (1945–1948)
 Kip Taylor (1949–1954)
 Tommy Prothro (1955–1964)
 Dee Andros (1965–1975)
 Craig Fertig (1976–1979)
 Joe Avezzano (1980–1984)
 Dave Kragthorpe (1985–1990)
 Jerry Pettibone (1991–1996)
 Mike Riley (1997–1998)
 Dennis Erickson (1999–2002)
 Mike Riley (2003–2014)
 Gary Andersen (2015–2017)
 Cory Hall # (2017)
 Jonathan Smith (2018–present)

Bowl games

Oregon State University has played in 19 postseason bowl games. The Beavers have also played in the Mirage Bowl, but this was a regular season game and a "bowl" in name only, not a post-season invitational bowl game. The Beavers lost the 1980 edition of the game against No. 14 ranked UCLA 34–3 in front of 80,000 at National Olympic Stadium in Tokyo, Japan.

The 19 bowl game total does not include an invitation to play in the Gotham Bowl in 1960, when no opponent could be found for Oregon State.   The Beavers are 12–7 in bowl game appearances.

Home stadium

The Beavers play their home games at Reser Stadium in Corvallis, Oregon. It was originally called Parker Stadium when it was constructed in 1953, and had a capacity of 25,000. Parker Stadium was renamed Reser Stadium in June 1999. Major renovations from 2005 to 2016 increased the stadium's capacity to 43,363, where it stood through the 2021 season. Another renovation project, called "Completing Reser", was announced on Feb. 4, 2021. The stadium featured a temporary capacity of 26,000 during the 2022 season and is projected to seat 38,000 at the completion of the construction project for the 2023 season.

Rivalries

Oregon

Oregon State University's primary rival is the University of Oregon. The two schools enjoy a fierce and long-standing rivalry due to the proximity of the two campuses. The teams first matched up on the gridiron in 1894 and have been playing each other almost every year since. The rivalry game between the two schools is traditionally the last game of each season. They have played each other 125 times which makes it the seventh-oldest college football rivalry game. Though not officially recognized by the universities, the Platypus Trophy is awarded annually to the winning alumni association.

Northwest Championship

Oregon State wins the so-called Northwest Championship by sweeping Washington, Washington State, and Oregon. The four Pacific Northwest rivals began playing in a round-robin format in the 1903 season. No trophy is awarded to the Northwest Champion, and no organization grants the title, although in 2002, the Washington Huskies wore homemade t-shirts for the Northwest Championship.

Notable players and coaches

Retired numbers

Although not a retired number Oregon State has "AL" displayed opposite Terry Baker's number "11" in Reser Stadium for long time donor/philanthropist/contributor Al Reser.

Individual national award winners

Players
Heisman Trophy
Terry Baker (1962)

Maxwell Award
Terry Baker (1962)

Groza Award
Alexis Serna (2005)

Biletnikoff Trophy
Mike Hass (2005)
Brandin Cooks (2013)

 Chic Harley Award
Terry Baker (1962)

Paul Hornung Award
Jack Colletto (2022)

National Football Foundation Scholar-Athlete of the Year Award
Mike Kline (1961)
Terry Baker (1962)

UPI College Football Player of the Year
Terry Baker (1962)

Sports Illustrated Sportsperson of the Year
Terry Baker (1962)

Sporting News College Football Player of the Year
Terry Baker (1962)

College Football Network Punt Returner of the Year
Anthony Gould (2022)

Coaches
Sporting News Coach of the Year
Dennis Erickson (2000)

AFCA Region 5 Coach of the Year
Mike Riley (2008)
Mike Riley (2012)
Jonathan Smith (2022)

Amos Alonzo Stagg Award
John Cooper (2016)

Individual conference awards
Pac-12 Offensive Player of the Year
Jacquizz Rodgers (2008)

Pac-12 Defensive Player of the Year
Bill Swancutt (2004†)
Stephen Paea (2010)

Pac-12 Freshman Player of the Year
Brandon Browner (2003)
Jeremy Perry (2005†)
Jacquizz Rodgers (2008)
Jermar Jefferson (2018)
Damien Martinez (2022)

Pac-12 Coach of the Year
Dave Kragthorpe (1989)
Dennis Erickson (2000)
Mike Riley (2008)
Jonathan Smith (2022†)

Pop Warner Trophy
Joe Francis (1957)
Terry Baker (1962)
Vern Burke (1963)
Pete Pifer (1966)

W. J. Voit Memorial Trophy
Terry Baker (1962)
Vern Burke (1963)
Pete Pifer (1966)

Morris Trophy
Esera Tuaolo (1989)
Inoke Breckterfield (1998)
Bill Swancutt (2004)
Stephen Paea (2008, 2009)

†Shared Award

All-Americans
Oregon State has had 45 first team All-Americans in the history of the program as of the end of the 2022 season, with 8 Consensus All-Americans and 2 Unanimous All-Americans.

 1916 Herman Abraham – HB
 1921 George "Gap" Powell – FB
 1928 Howard Maple – QB
 1933 Red Franklin – HB
 1933 Ade Schwammel – T
 1939 Eberle Schultz – OG
 1940 Vic Sears – T
 1941 Quentin Greenough – C
 1946 Bill Gray – C
 1955 John Witte – T
 1956 John Witte – T †
 1958 Ted Bates – OT †
 1962 Terry Baker – QB ‡
 1963 Vern Burke – SE †
 1964 Jack O'Billovich – LB
 1964 Rich Koeper – OT
 1967 Jess Lewis – DT
 1967 Jon Sandstrom – G
 1967 John Didion – C
 1968 John Didion – C ‡
 1968 Bill Enyart – FB 
 1970 Craig Hanneman – DT
 1972 Steve Brown – LB
 1979 Steve Coury – SE
 1992 Fletcher Keister – OG
 1998 Inoke Breckterfield – DE
 2000 Ken Simonton – TB
 2000 DeLawrence Grant – DE
 2000 Chris Gibson – C
 2000 Richard Seigler – LB
 2001 Dennis Weathersby – CB
 2001 Mitch Meeuwsen – S
 2002 Dennis Weathersby – CB
 2002 Steven Jackson – TB
 2003 Steven Jackson – TB
 2003 Brandon Browner – CB
 2004 Mitch Meeuwsen – FS
 2004 Mike Hass – WR
 2005 Mike Hass – WR
 2005 Alexis Serna – PK
 2005 Jeremy Perry – OT
 2006 Sammie Stroughter – PR
 2007 Roy Schuening – OG
 2008 Andy Levitre – OT
 2009 Jacquizz Rodgers – RB
 2009 James Rodgers – WR
 2010 Stephen Paea – DT †
 2012 Jordan Poyer – CB †
 2013 Brandin Cooks – WR †
 2019 Hamilcar Rashed Jr. - LB
 2022 Anthony Gould – PR
 2022 Brandon Kipper - G

† Consensus Selection, ‡ Unanimous Selection

College Football Hall of Fame inductees
The Beavers have had three players and three coaches inducted into the College Football Hall of Fame.

Notable former players

 James Allen, former linebacker for the New Orleans Saints
 Sam Baker, NFL player in 1953, 1956–1969
 Terry Baker, 1962 Heisman Trophy winner, Maxwell Award winner, Sportsman of the Year, and NFL quarterback from 1963 to 1965
 Kelly Chapman, TE – Ottawa Rough Riders 1994–1996
 José Cortéz, NFL placekicker from 1999 to 2006
 Bill Enyart, NFL player from 1969 to 1971
 Joe Francis, NFL QB from 1958 to 1959
 DeLawrence Grant, former linebacker for the Oakland Raiders
 Bob Grim, NFL player from 1967 to 1977 and one-time Pro Bowler
 Bob Horn, NFL linebacker from 1976 to 1983
 T. J. Houshmandzadeh, former NFL wide receiver
 Chad Johnson, former NFL wide receiver. Two time AFC leader in receiving yards. 5 Time Pro Bowler 
 Osia Lewis, player and coach
 Paul Lowe, AFL running back from 1960 to 1969, two-time AFL All-Star, 1965 AFL MVP, & member of the AFL All-Time Team
 Greg Marshall, NFL defensive lineman (Baltimore Colts), 1978–1979, CFL Ottawa Rough Riders, 1980–88.  All League multiple times, 1983 Defensive Player of the Year.  Member of All Time Franchise Team.  Current Head Football Coach, University of Toronto.  
 Pellom McDaniels, Defensive lineman in the World League of American Football from 1991 to 1992 for the Birmingham Fire, and NFL from 1993 to 2000 for the Kansas City Chiefs & Atlanta Falcons
 Bill McKalip, NFL player from 1932 to 1932, 1934, 1936
 Bronco Mendenhall, former head coach of the Virginia Cavaliers, 2016–2021
 Lyle Moevao, QB Graduate Assistant for the Beavers and former quarterback for the La Courneuve Flash of the Ligue Élite de Football Américain. Won the French football championship in 2011.
 Joe Phillips, NFL defensive lineman from 1986 to 1999
 Steve Preece, NFL defensive back from 1969 to 1977
 Frank Ramsey, NFL offensive lineman, 1945 Chicago Bears
 Rocky Rasley, NFL guard from 1969 to 1970, 1972–1976
 Terrell Roberts, NFL player 2003–2004
 Ade Schwammel, NFL player from 1934 to 1936, 1943–1944
 Vic Sears, NFL player from 1941 to 1943, 1945–1953 and member of the NFL 1940s All-Decade Team
 Ken Simonton, former running back for the Buffalo Bills
 Jonathan Smith, former offensive coordinator at the University of Washington and current head coach.
 George Svendsen, NFL center from 1935 to 1937, 1940–1941 and member of the NFL 1930s All-Decade Team
 Aaron Thomas, NFL player from 1961 to 1970
 Robb Thomas, NFL wide receiver from 1989 to 1998
 Reggie Tongue, NFL defensive back from 1996 to 2005
 Esera Tuaolo, NFL defensive tackle from 1991 to 1999
 F. Wayne Valley, Founder and principal owner of the Oakland Raiders & former President of the American Football League
 Skip Vanderbundt, NFL Linebacker, SF 49ers (1969–1977) N.O. Saints (1978)
 Lloyd Wickett, NFL defensive lineman 1943, 1946 for the Detroit Lions
 Len Younce, NFL guard in 1941, 1943–1944, 1946–1948 & member of the NFL 1940s All-Decade Team
 Steven Jackson, NFL running back, Rams
 Brandin Cooks, NFL wide receiver, Houston Texans
Jordin Poyer, NFL safety, Buffalo Bills

Media
Radio flagship: KEX 1190 AM in Portland
Broadcasters: Mike Parker (play-by-play), Jim Wilson (analyst), and Ron Callan (sideline reporter).
Oregon State also has an extensive network of broadcast affiliates.

Future non-conference opponents
Announced schedules as of January 17, 2020.

References

External links

 

 
American football teams established in 1893
1893 establishments in Oregon